Ellis Eugene Vance (February 25, 1923 – February 16, 2012) was an American professional basketball player. He played in the Basketball Association of America (BAA) and National Basketball Association (NBA) for the Chicago Stags and Tri-Cities Blackhawks / Milwaukee Hawks. 

Vance played college basketball for the Illinois Fighting Illini where he led the team as a member of the famed "Whiz Kids" of the 1940s. He and the other Whiz Kids, Andy Phillip, Art Mathisen, Ken Menke, and Jack Smiley, are regarded as some of Illinois' all-time greats, but only he and Phillip are on the team's all-century team. Vance and his Whiz Kids teammates left basketball to serve in World War II in 1943. Vance was selected by the Stags in the 1948 NBA draft, and played professionally for five seasons. He served as the athletic director of the University of Illinois at Urbana–Champaign from 1967 to 1972.
 
Vance was married to Grace Hoberg from 1943 until her death from stomach cancer in 1980. Vance later married Janann Duffy and had four children. He died on February 16, 2012, at age 88.

Honors

 1973, Inducted into the Illinois Basketball Coaches Association's Hall of Fame as a player.
 2004, Elected to the "Illini Men's Basketball All-Century Team".
 December 18, 2006, The post office in his hometown of Clinton was named the "Gene Vance Post Office" in his honor.
 September 13, 2008 Awarded as one of the thirty-three honored jerseys which hang in the State Farm Center to show regard for being the most decorated basketball players in the University of Illinois' history.

College and professional statistics

University of Illinois

BAA/NBA

Regular season

Playoffs

References

External links
 
 

1923 births
2012 deaths
American men's basketball players
Basketball players from Illinois
Chicago Stags draft picks
Chicago Stags players
Forwards (basketball)
Guards (basketball)
Illinois Fighting Illini athletic directors
Illinois Fighting Illini men's basketball players
Milwaukee Hawks players
People from Clinton, Illinois
Tri-Cities Blackhawks players